Nicolas Usaï (born 1 May 1974) is a French professional football manager and former player who is the head coach of Championnat National club Orléans. As a player, he was a left-back.

Managerial career 
Usaï had a career as a semi-amateur footballer, before he began his managerial career in the lower divisions of France. He was named the best manager of the 2015–16 Championnat National.

On 24 October 2018, Usaï was named the manager of Ligue 2 club Châteauroux. He was sacked by the club in December 2020.

On 4 January 2022, Usaï became the new manager of Ligue 2 club Nîmes. On 16 November 2022, he was relieved of his duties.

On 28 December 2022, Usaï was hired by Championnat National club Orléans.

References

External links 
LFP Profile

1974 births
Living people
Footballers from Marseille
Association football fullbacks
French footballers
FC Istres players
Valenciennes FC players
Olympique Alès players
Angoulême Charente FC players
AS Cherbourg Football players
French football managers
Ligue 2 managers
CS Sedan Ardennes managers
LB Châteauroux managers
Nîmes Olympique managers
US Orléans managers